The 1939 season was the tenth completed season of Finnish Football League Championship, known as the Mestaruussarja.

Overview

The 1939 Mestaruussarja  was contested by 8 teams, with TPS Turku winning the championship. KPT Kuopio and Viipurin Reipas were relegated to the second tier which was known as the Suomensarja.

League table

The league was abandoned due to the Winter War (14 rounds having been scheduled). The above table was declared final.

Results

Footnotes

References

Mestaruussarja seasons
Fin
Fin
1939 in Finnish football